Apple River Township is one of twenty-three townships in Jo Daviess County, Illinois, USA.  As of the 2010 census, its population was 498 and it contained 257 housing units.  It was formed from Thompson Township on September 13, 1858.

Geography

Cities, towns, villages
 Apple River.

Cemeteries
The township contains Saint Joseph Cemetery.

Airports and landing strips
 Foster Field (IL28).

Demographics

School districts
 Scales Mound Community Unit School District 211.
 Warren Community Unit School District 205.

Political districts
 Illinois' 16th congressional district.
 State House District 89.
 State Senate District 45.

References
 
 United States Census Bureau 2007 TIGER/Line Shapefiles.
 United States National Atlas.

External links
 Jo Daviess County official site.
 City-Data.com.
 Illinois State Archives.
 Township Officials of Illinois.

Townships in Jo Daviess County, Illinois
Townships in Illinois